A fan vault is a form of vault used in the Gothic style, in which the ribs are all of the same curve and spaced equidistantly, in a manner resembling a fan.  The initiation and propagation of this design element is strongly associated with England.

The earliest example, dating from about the year 1351, may be seen in the cloisters of Gloucester Cathedral. The largest fan vault in the world can be found in King's College Chapel, Cambridge.

The fan vault is peculiar to England. The lierne vault of the cathedral of Barbastro in northern Spain closely resembles a fan vault, but it does not form a perfect conoid. Harvey (1978) suggests Catherine of Aragon as a possible source of English influence in Aragon.

Birth of the fan vault
The fan vault is attributed to development in Gloucester between 1351 and 1377, with the earliest known surviving example being the east cloister walk of Gloucester Cathedral. Harvey (1978) hypothesises that the east cloister at Gloucester was finished under Thomas de Cantebrugge from the hamlet of Cambridge, Gloucestershire, who left in 1364 to work on the chapter house at Hereford Cathedral (also thought to have been fan vaulted on the basis of a drawing by William Stukeley). The other three parts of the cloister at Gloucester were begun in 1381, possibly under Robert Lesyngham.

Other examples of early fan vaults exist around Gloucester, implying the activity of several 14th century master masons in that region.

Structure 
The ribs of a fan vault are of equal curvature and rotated at equal distances around a central (vertical) axis, forming the conoid shape which gives rise to the name. In between sequences of conoids, flat central spandrels fill the space. According to Leedy (1980), the fan vault was developed in England (as opposed to France and other centres of Gothic architecture) due to the manner in which English rib vaults were normally constructed. In an English rib vault, the courses are laid perpendicular to the rib while in France they are laid perpendicular to the wall.

Buildings with fan vaulting

Medieval and Early Modern
Gloucester Cathedral, cloisters, earliest fan vaulting begun 1373 by Abbot Horton
King's College Chapel, Cambridge, the world's largest fan vault (1512–1515)
Bath Abbey, Somerset, nave and chancel (1860s restoration; originally by William Vertue)
Brasenose College, Oxford, Chapel ceiling – a spectacular example of plaster pendant fan vaulting
Canterbury Cathedral, crossing tower by John Wastell, Henry VI's chantry chapel
Christ Church, Oxford, staircase to the great hall
Church of St Andrew, Mells, Somerset, porch
Church of St John the Baptist, Axbridge, Somerset, crossing
Church of St Peter and St Paul, Muchelney, Somerset, under the tower
Church of St. John the Baptist, Cirencester, Gloucestershire, porch and north chapel
Collegiate Church of St Mary, Warwick, Dean's Chapel
Convocation House, Oxford
Corpus Christi College, Cambridge, main gateway
Ely Cathedral, Bishop Alcock's chantry chapel
Eton College Chapel (the vault dates from 1958)
Hampton Court Palace, Great Gate and oriel window in the Great Hall
Henry VII's Lady Chapel, Westminster Abbey, London, 1503–1509 (with pendants, by William Vertue)
Lincoln's Inn Chapel, undercroft
Manchester Cathedral, under the tower
Milton Abbey, Dorset, crossing (by William Smyth)
Peterborough Cathedral, Cambridgeshire, retrochoir
Red Mount Chapel, King's Lynn
Sherborne Abbey, Dorset, quire c. 1430, nave c. 1490 (by William Smyth)
St Andrew's Church, Cullompton, Devon, south aisle
St Bartholomew's Church, Tong, Shropshire, chantry chapel
St David's Cathedral, Wales, Trinity Chapel
St Mary Aldermary, London (by Christopher Wren)
St Mary's Church, North Leigh, Oxfordshire, Wilcote chantry chapel
St Mary's Church, Ottery St Mary, Devon, aisle
St Stephen's cloister at the Palace of Westminster (1529)
St. George's Chapel, Windsor, crossing, Urswick chantry chapel
Tewkesbury Abbey, cloister (only one bay remains)
University College, Oxford, gatehouse vaults
University Church of St Mary the Virgin, Oxford, porch
Wells Cathedral, crossing (by William Smyth)
Winchester Cathedral, Beaufort and Waynflete chantry chapels
St. Mary’s Church, Putney, Bishop West chapel

Gothic Revival
Centre Block, Parliament of Canada, Ottawa
Eastnor Castle, drawing room
Grand Theatre, Leeds
Harkness Tower, Yale University, New Haven, Connecticut, US
House of Lords lobbies, committee staircase, in the Palace of Westminster
John Rylands Library, baconcy, Manchester
Middlesex Guildhall, Westminster
Palau de la Música Catalana, Barcelona
Basilica Minore de San Sebastián, Manila, Philippines
St John's, Edinburgh
St Mary's Church, Wellingborough, Northamptonshire
Saint Patrick's Church, New Orleans, Louisiana, US (apsidal fan vault)
Strawberry Hill, Twickenham, London
Unitarian Church in Charleston, South Carolina, US
Washington National Cathedral, Washington, DC, US (Children's Chapel)
Wills Memorial Building, University of Bristol
Cathedral Basilica of Christ the King, Hamilton, Ontario

See also

 List of architectural vaults
 Gothic architecture
 Gothic cathedrals and churches

References 

Arches and vaults
Architecture in England
Medieval architecture